Olive Riley (20 October 1899 – 12 July 2008) was an Australian centenarian, who was believed for a time to have been the world's oldest personal internet blogger, and was the subject of a television documentary.

American politician and radio talk show hostess Ruth Hamilton of Orlando, Florida was later found to be older and also a blogger.

ABC Documentary 
Michael Rubbo, a documentary film maker, started to chronicle the centenarian's life and directed a TV special entitled All About Olive that broadcast on the ABC.

Blogs (audio and video) and personal life
Riley subsequently began an internet blog entitled The Life of Riley (The title of her blog being a name-play on both her surname and the American 1940s radio serial, that was also adapted to television. a film and comic book (The Life of Riley) in February 2007 at the age of 107 and posted posted over 70 entries, 

as well as several video posts on YouTube, in which she discusses both living through World War I and World War II, the years of The Great Depression, raising 3 children, working as a barmaid, her love for drinking shandy and being a fan of the AFL Sydney Swans.

The blog was suggested by Journalist Eric Shackle, a man in his late eighties, who was interested in promoting the idea that one is never too old for the internet.

Riley who was born in Broken Hill, New South Wales could not see well enough to type, so Rubbo set up the blog for her and ran it for next two years with Shackle's assistance, recording her stories, at first on audio and then later on video, to post over 100 YouTube items, all still visible today, as is her archive at mike.mikerubbo.com.

She made her last post two weeks before she died aged 108, at a nursing home in Woy Woy, New South Wales.

See also 
 María Amelia López Soliño
 List of centenarians

References

Olive Riley Youtube videos 
 List of Olive Riley's YouTube submissions

External links and references
 "World's oldest blogger makes final post", The Sydney Morning Herald, 15 July 2008. (Accessed 15 July 2008).
 "World's oldest blogger Olive Riley of NSW dies", The Courier-Mail, 13 July 2008. (Accessed 15 July 2008).
 Photograph of Olive Riley (in 2007, aged 107, at her nursing home in Woy Woy, New South Wales)
 World's oldest blogger no more
 International Business Times: World's oldest blogger, Olive Riley, dies at 108 

1899 births
2008 deaths
Australian bloggers
Australian centenarians
People from New South Wales
Australian women bloggers
Women centenarians
Australian YouTubers
People from Broken Hill, New South Wales